The Office of the Basic Education Commission (OBEC) is a Thai governmental agency, founded in 2003. It is an office of the Thai Ministry of Education (MOE). Its mission is to organize and promote basic education from primary school to high school.

History
The Office of the Basic Education Commission (OBEC) was formed by combining the Department of General Education of Office of the National Primary Education Commission and the Office of Private Education Commission of the Ministry of Education.

On about October 2021, its website was compromised by an individual identifying themselves as "WarotS". There they posted bomb threats against a Chinese consulate in San Francisco and the headquarters office of American instant messaging company Discord.

Departments
The Office of the Basic Education Commission has agencies in each region including an Education Service Area Office in 181 areas  and 16 central agencies. They are:
 Bureau of General Administration
 Bureau of Financial
 Bureau of Monitoring and Evaluation
 Bureau of Educational Testing 
 Bureau of Technology for Teaching and Learning
 Bureau of Policy and Planning 
 Bureau of Special Education Administration
 Bureau of Educational Innovation Development
 Bureau of Personnel Administration Development and Legal Affairs
 Bureau of Student Activities Development
 Bureau of Teachers and Basic Education Personnel Development
 English Language Institute
 Upper Secondary Education Bureau
Bureau of Education Development for a Special Administrative Zone in Southern
 Public Sector Development Group 
 Internal Auditing Unit
 Center for Science High School Development

References

Government departments of Thailand
Educational organizations based in Thailand
Ministry of Education (Thailand)